Langton Cutler Dysart (November 25, 1898 – December 8, 1956) was a Canadian politician. He served in the Legislative Assembly of New Brunswick as member of the Liberal party from 1944 to 1952.

References

1898 births
1956 deaths
20th-century Canadian politicians
New Brunswick Liberal Association MLAs
People from Kent County, New Brunswick